The third season of The Rockford Files originally aired Fridays at 9:00-10:00 pm on NBC from September 24, 1976 to April 1, 1977.

Episodes

1976 American television seasons
1977 American television seasons
The Rockford Files seasons